The Conference USA Men's Soccer Coach of the Year was an annual award given to the best soccer coach in Conference USA during the NCAA Division I men's soccer season. Since its inception, the award has been given to 18 different coaches. Chris Grassie, Tim McClements, Bob Gray, Tom McIntosh, Richie Grant, and Mike Getman have each won the award twice. Schellas Hyndman and John Hackworth have gone on to coach professionally in MLS.

Coach of the Year 
 2021: Kyle Russell, FIU
 2020: Chris Grassie, Marshall
 2019: Chris Grassie, Marshall
 2018: John Cedergreen, Kentucky
 2017: Kevin Nylen, FIU
 2016: Kevin Langan, Charlotte
 2015: Scott Calabrese, FIU and Johan Cedergren, Kentucky
 2014: Johan Cedergren, Kentucky
 2013: Jeremy Fishbein, New Mexico
 2012: Tim McClements, SMU
 2011: Mark Berson, South Carolina
 2010: Tim McClements, SMU 
 2009: Bob Gray, Marshall
 2008: Tom McIntosh, Tulsa
 2007: Tom McIntosh, Tulsa
 2006: Schellas Hyndman, SMU
 2005: Bob Gray, Marshall
 2004: Richie Grant, Memphis
 2003: Hylton Dayes, Cincinnati
 2002: Tony Colavecchia, Louisville
 2001: Dan Donigan, Saint Louis
 2000: Richie Grant, Memphis
 1999: Mike Getman, UAB
 1998: John Hackworth, USF
 1997: Jeff Cook, Cincinnati
 1996: John Tart, Charlotte
 1995: Mike Getman, UAB

References

External links
 

NCAA Division I men's soccer conference coaches of the year
Conference USA men's soccer
Awards established in 1995